Season of da Siccness: The Resurrection is the debut studio album by American rapper Brotha Lynch Hung, released on February 28, 1995 by Blackmarket Records.

Background
Mann recorded and mixed the album in 1994 at Enharmonic Studio, Sacramento, California. The album is dedicated to Q-Ball (as stated in the album booklet), Mann's cousin who was murdered around the time of the album's creation. The song 'Liquor Sicc' touches on subjects of dealing with his death and retaliation. Personnel on the album include Brotha Lynch Hung, Mr. Doctor, Ron Foster, X-Raided, Zigg Zagg, Zoe, Sicx, Hyst, and Babe Reg. Mann has stated that he produced, mixed and mastered the entire album himself, which to this day is the only album in which he has done this. The album was reprinted and re-released in 2005 as the original Black Market pressing is out of print. This re-release is distributed by IDN Distribution.

Reception

The album reached #13 on Billboard'''s Heatseekers chart, #26 on the Top R&B/Hip-Hop Albums chart, and #163 on the Billboard 200. 
It gained 4.5 stars out of 5 from allmusic. 
In 2009, Fangoria'' named it as an iconic horrorcore album.

Track listing

Personnel

Brotha Lynch Hung – vocals, production
Cedric Singleton – executive producer, layout photography & design
Robert Foster – associate producer
Darrin Keatley – engineering
Leslie Debbs – project management

Samples
Locc 2 Da Brain: MC Shan - Left Me Lonely
Datz Real Gangsta: Juicy - Sugar Free
Deep Down: The Ohio Players - Funky Worm

Charts

Weekly charts

Year-end charts

References

1995 debut albums
Brotha Lynch Hung albums
G-funk albums